Adlawan is a Filipino surname of Cebuano origin (means "in daylight"). Notable people with the surname include:

Aloy Adlawan, Filipino film director and screenwriter
Irma Adlawan (born 1962), Filipino actress
Temistokles Adlawan, Filipino writer and poet

Cebuano-language surnames